was a village located in Yoshino District, Nara Prefecture, Japan.

As of 2003, the village had an estimated population of 781 and a density of 7.03 persons per km2. The total area was 111.06 km2.

On September 25, 2005, Ōtō, along with the village of Nishiyoshino (also from Yoshino District), was merged into the expanded city of Gojō.

Dissolved municipalities of Nara Prefecture
Populated places disestablished in 2005
2005 disestablishments in Japan